Goluj Subregion is a subregion in the western Gash-Barka region (Zoba Gash-Barka) of Eritrea. It has its capital at Golluj.

References
Goluj

Gash-Barka Region
Subregions of Eritrea